Shin Il-yong (born 17 February 1979) is a South Korean race walker.

Achievements

References

1979 births
Living people
South Korean male racewalkers
Athletes (track and field) at the 1998 Asian Games
Athletes (track and field) at the 2000 Summer Olympics
Athletes (track and field) at the 2004 Summer Olympics
Olympic athletes of South Korea
Asian Games competitors for South Korea
21st-century South Korean people